Ülo Raudmäe (until 1936 Saksberg; 24 January 1923 Rapla – 14 October 1990 Tallinn) was an Estonian conductor, composer and trombonist.

In 1946, he graduated from Tallinn State Conservatory, specializing in trombone.

1950–1979, he played the trombone in Estonia Theatre.

Since 1972, he was a member of Estonian Composers' Union.

Works

 song "Heinaveol"
 song "Vaid sulle"
 song "Maantee" (1956)
 musical "Kiri nõudmiseni"

References

1923 births
1990 deaths
Estonian conductors (music)
20th-century Estonian musicians
20th-century Estonian composers
Estonian Academy of Music and Theatre alumni
People from Rapla